"Hey, Man!" is a song by Canadian singer-songwriter Nelly Furtado, produced by Gerald Eaton and Brian West for Furtado's debut album, Whoa, Nelly!. The song was released as the album's fourth and final single, but it charted only in Netherlands, where it reached number 87 and Romania, where it reached number 65.

Music video
The music video for "Hey, Man!" is a compilation of videos containing various live performances of the song as well as backstage footage and prep for her Burn in the Spotlight Tour. The main footage was shot live in London, United Kingdom from her "MTV Live in London" show at the London Forum, where she also performed "…on the Radio (Remember the Days)", "Turn Off the Light", "Baby Girl", "I'm Like a Bird" and "Get Ur Freak On (Remix)".

Track listing
German 2-track single

Charts

Release history

References

2002 singles
Nelly Furtado songs
Songs written by Nelly Furtado
2000 songs